Pikliz is a condiment in Haitian cuisine of pickled cabbage, carrots, bell peppers and Scotch bonnet peppers. It is often seasoned with garlic and onion and pickled in white vinegar. The spicy dish is very commonly served on the table along with other dishes to enhance the flavor. It is useful for cutting through the greasiness of fried foods such as  griot (fried pork), tassot (fried beef), or bannann peze (fried plantains) and enhancing rice and beans. The name of the dish itself may be based on the French word piquer which means 'to sting'. It has traditionally been produced at the household level but it is increasingly produced industrially as the number of Haitians living abroad also increases.

See also 
 Curtido
 Kimchi

References

Haitian cuisine